Norin is a jamoat in Tajikistan. It is located in Yovon District in Khatlon Region. The jamoat has a total population of 21,314 (2015).

References

Populated places in Khatlon Region
Jamoats of Tajikistan